Wilfred Henry "Lefty" Lefebvre (November 11, 1915 – January 19, 2007) was an American professional baseball player and scout, and college baseball head coach. A southpaw pitcher and native of West Warwick, Rhode Island, LeFebvre had a nine-year playing career (1938–1944; 1946–1947). He appeared in 36 games in Major League Baseball as a member of the Boston Red Sox (six games in –) and Washington Senators (30 games during –). LeFebvre entered baseball after graduating from the College of the Holy Cross.

In 1935, LeFebvre played for Falmouth in the Cape Cod Baseball League (CCBL) and helped lead the team to the league title.

In MLB, LeFebvre posted a 5–5 record and a 5.03 earned run average. In 132 innings pitched, he surrendered 162 hits and 51 bases on balls, fanning 36. He made ten starts among his 36 appearances, with three complete games. He notched three saves as a relief pitcher. 

In his major league debut on June 10, 1938, in his very first at-bat, Lefebvre hit his only MLB home run over Fenway's Green Monster. The opposite-field blow, a solo shot, came off Monty Stratton of the Chicago White Sox in the midst of a mop-up assignment, as Chicago thrashed the Red Sox, 15–2.

From 1949 to 1963, Lefebvre was the head baseball coach at Brown University. He also served as a longtime scout for the Senators and Red Sox. In the early 1960s he also returned to the CCBL to manage the Dennis Clippers and Chatham Red Sox.

See also
 List of Major League Baseball players with a home run in their first major league at bat

References

External links

Bill LeFebvre biography from Society for American Baseball Research (SABR)

1915 births
2007 deaths
Baseball players from Rhode Island
Boston Red Sox players
Boston Red Sox scouts
Brown Bears baseball coaches
Cape Cod Baseball League coaches
Cape Cod Baseball League players (pre-modern era)
College of the Holy Cross alumni
Falmouth Commodores players
Holy Cross Crusaders baseball players
Louisville Colonels (minor league) players
Major League Baseball pitchers
Minneapolis Millers (baseball) players
Minot Mallards players
Pawtucket Slaters players
People from West Warwick, Rhode Island
Providence Chiefs players
San Francisco Seals (baseball) players
Scranton Red Sox players
Washington Senators (1901–1960) players
Washington Senators (1901–60) scouts